The Hunnic language, or Hunnish, was the language spoken by Huns in the Hunnic Empire, a heterogeneous, multi-ethnic tribal confederation which invaded Eastern and Central Europe, and ruled most of Pannonian Eastern Europe, during the 4th and 5th centuries CE. A variety of languages were spoken within the Hun Empire. A contemporary report by Priscus has that Hunnish was spoken alongside Gothic and the languages of other tribes subjugated by the Huns.

As no inscriptions or whole sentences in the Hunnic language have been preserved, the attested corpus is very limited, consisting almost entirely of proper names in Greek and Latin sources.

The Hunnic language cannot be classified at present, but due to the origin of these proper names it has been compared mainly with Turkic, Mongolic, Eastern Iranian languages, and Yeniseian languages, with a majority of scholars supporting Turkic. Other scholars consider the available evidence inconclusive and the Hunnish language therefore unclassifiable.

Corpus
Contemporary observers of the European Huns, such as Priscus and the 6th century historian Jordanes, preserved three words of the language of the Huns:  

The words medos, a beverage akin to mead, kamos, a barley drink, and strava, a funeral feast, are of Indo-European origin. They may be of Slavic, Germanic and/or Iranian origin. Maenchen-Helfen argued that strava may have come from an informant who spoke Slavic.

All other information on the Hunnic language is contained in the form of personal and tribal names.

Possible affiliations
Many of the waves of nomadic peoples who swept into Eastern Europe, are known to have spoken languages from a variety of families. Several proposals for the affinities of Hunnic have been made.

Unclassifiable
Given the small corpus, a number of scholars hold the Hunnic language to be unclassifiable until further evidence, if any, is discovered. András Róna-Tas notes that "the very scant sources of information are often mutually contradictory."

Turkic or Altaic sprachbund
A number of historians and linguists including Karl Heinrich Menges, and Omeljan Pritsak feel that the proper names only allow the Hunnic language to be positioned in relationship to the Altaic language group, which is itself a widely discredited language family. Although Menges was reserved towards the language evidence, his view of the Huns was that "there are ethnological reasons for considering them Turkic or close to the Turks". As further possibilities, Menges suggests that the Huns could have spoken a Mongolian or Tungusic language, or possibly a language between Mongolian and Turkic. Pritsak analyzed 33 surviving Hunnic personal names and concluded: "It was not a Turkic language, but one between Turkic and Mongolian, probably closer to the former than the latter. The language had strong ties to Bulgar language and to modern Chuvash, but also had some important connections, especially lexical and morphological, to Ottoman Turkish and Yakut".

The "traditional and prevailing view is [...] that the Xiongnu and/or the Huns were Turkic" speakers. Otto Maenchen-Helfen argues that many tribal and proper names among the Huns appear to have originated in Turkic languages, indicating that the language was Turkic. Hyun Jin Kim similarly concluded that it "seems highly likely then from the names that we do know, most of which seem to be Turkic, that the Hunnic elite was predominantly Turkic-speaking". Denis Sinor, while skeptical of our ability to classify Hunnic as a whole, states that part of the Hunnish elite likely spoke Turkic, though he notes that some Hunnic names cannot be Turkic in origin. The historian Peter Heather, while he supported the Turkic hypothesis as the "best guess" in 1995, has since voiced skepticism, in 2010 saying that "the truth is that we don't know what language the Huns spoke, and probably never will". Savelyev and Jeong similarly note that "the majority of the previously proposed Turkic etymologies for the Hunnic names are far from unambiguous, so no firm conclusion can be drawn from this type of data."

Yeniseian
Some scholars – most notably Lajos Ligeti (1950/51) and Edwin G. Pulleyblank (1962) – have claimed that languages of Siberia, especially Ket – a member of the Yeniseian language family – may have been a major source (or perhaps even the linguistic core) of the Xiongnu and/or Hunnic languages. First proposed by Edwin G. Pulleyblank, the theory that the Xiongnu language belonged to the Yeniseian languages was reinforced by the discovery of the Kot and Pumpokol word lists, which Alexander Vovin used to create a more accurate reconstruction. Hyun Jin Kim in 2013 proposed that the Huns experienced a language flip like the Chagatai Khanate, switching from Yeniseian to Oghuric Turkic after absorbing the Dingling or Tiele peoples.

Vajda (et al. 2013) proposed that the ruling elite of the Huns spoke a Yeniseian language and influenced other languages in the region. The Yeniseian people were likely assimilated later by Turkic and Mongolic groups.

Alexander Savelyev and Choongwon Jeong criticize the Yeniseian proposal by Pulleyblank and note that the more convincing Yeniseian words may be shared cultural vocabulary that was non-native to both the Xiongnu and the Yeniseians.

Indo-European
All three words described as "Hunnic" by ancient sources appear to be Indo-European.

A number of scholars suggest that a Germanic language, possibly Gothic, may have coexisted with another Hunnic language as the lingua franca of the Hunnic Empire. Maenchen-Helfen suggests that the words medos and kamos could possibly be of Germanic origin. He argues that Attila, Bleda, Laudaricus, Onegesius, Ragnaris, and Ruga are Germanic, while Heather also includes the names Scottas and Berichus. Kim questions the Germanic etymologies of Ruga, Attila, and Bleda, arguing that there are "more probable Turkic etymologies." Elsewhere, he argues that the Germanicization of Hunnic names may have been a conscious policy of the Hunnic elite in the Western part of the Empire.

Maenchen-Helfen also classified some names as having roots in Iranian. Christopher Atwood has argued, as one explanation for his proposed etymology of the name Hun that, "their state or confederation must be seen as the result of Sogdian/Baktrian [Iranian-speaking] leadership and organization". Subjects of the Huns included Iranian-speaking Alans and Sarmatians, Maenchen-Helfen argues that the Iranian names were likely borrowed from the Persians and finds none prior to the 5th century; he takes this to mean that the Alans had little influence inside of Attila's empire. Kim, however, argues for a considerable presence of Iranian-speakers among the Huns.

The word strava has been argued to be of Slavic origin and to show a presence of Slavic speakers among the Huns. Peter Heather, however, argues that this word "is certainly a very slender peg upon which to hang the claim that otherwise undocumented Slavs played a major role in Attila's empire". In the 19th century, some Russian scholars argued that the Huns as a whole had spoken a Slavic language.

Uralic
In the 19th century, some scholars, such as German Sinologist Julius Heinrich Klaproth, argued that the Huns had spoken a Finno-Ugric language and connected them with the ancient Hungarians.

Possible script
It is possible that a written form of Hunnic existed and may yet be identified from artifacts. Priscus recorded that Hunnic secretaries read out names of fugitives from a written list. Franz Altheim considered it was not Greek or Latin, but a script like the Oguric Turkic of the Bulgars. He argued that the runes were brought into Europe from Central Asia by the Huns, and were an adapted version of the old Sogdian alphabet in the Hunnic (Oghur Turkic) language. Zacharias Rhetor wrote that in 507/508 AD, Bishop Qardust of Arran went to the land of the Caucasian Huns for seven years, and returned with books written in the Hunnic language. There is some debate as to whether a Xiongnu-Xianbei runic system existed, and was part of a wider Eurasian script which gave rise to the Old Turkic alphabet in the 8th century.

Footnotes

References
 
 
 
 
 
 
 
 
 
 
 
 
 
 
 

 
 
 
 
 

Extinct languages of Europe
Extinct languages of Asia
Unclassified languages of Europe
Unclassified languages of Asia
Languages attested from the 4th century
Languages extinct in the 6th century
Huns
Hunno-Bulgar languages